Fagner may refer to:

 Raimundo Fagner (born 1949), Brazilian singer, composer, musician, actor and music producer
 Fágner (footballer, born 1988), Brazilian football forward
 Fagner (footballer, born 1988), Brazilian football midfielder
 Fagner (footballer, born 1989), Brazilian football right-back
 Fagner Bahia (born 1990), Brazilian football forward